Gerardo Manuel Reinoso Torres (born 16 May 1965 in La Rioja) is a former Argentine professional footballer who played for the Argentina national team. After retiring as a player he turned to management and currently works as the coach of Deportes Valdivia in Chile.

Playing career

Reinoso started his career with Independiente where he was part of the squad that won the  Copa Libertadores and Copa Intercontinental in 1984.

In 1988 Reinoso joined River Plate helping the club to win the 1989–1990 championship. In 1991, he joined River's fiercest rivals Boca Juniors but only played three games for the club, two of which were the championship final against Newell's Old Boys, which Boca lost.

After a brief return to Independiente Reinoso became a journeyman footballer, playing all over Latin America for clubs such as Unión Española, Santiago Wanderers, Palestino and Universidad Católica in Chile, Universidad Autonoma de Tamaulipas (Correcaminos) and Club Leon in Mexico, LDU Quito in Ecuador, Deportivo Cali and Independiente Santa Fe de Bogotá in Colombia, Jorge Wilstermann and Oriente Petrolero in Bolivia.

He also had spells in the Argentine lower leagues with General Paz Juniors and Patronato de Paraná.

Titles as a player

Managerial career

Reinoso worked as manager of General Paz Juniors and Patronato de Paraná in the lower leagues of Argentine football. He then had a spell with Rangers de Talca in Chile, Tiburones Rojos de Coatzacoalcos and Tiburones Rojos de Veracruz in Mexico, before joining Luis Ángel Firpo.

Personal life
He is the father-in-law of Joaquín Larrivey, a professional football player.

References

External links

1965 births
Living people
Sportspeople from La Rioja Province, Argentina
Argentine footballers
Argentina international footballers
Argentine football managers
Club Atlético Independiente footballers
Club Atlético River Plate footballers
Boca Juniors footballers
Unión Española footballers
Club Deportivo Universidad Católica footballers
L.D.U. Quito footballers
Deportivo Cali footballers
Correcaminos UAT footballers
Club León footballers
C.D. Jorge Wilstermann players
Oriente Petrolero players
Argentine Primera División players
Chilean Primera División players
Categoría Primera A players
Liga MX players
Bolivian Primera División players
Expatriate footballers in Chile
Expatriate footballers in Mexico
Expatriate footballers in Bolivia
Expatriate footballers in Colombia
C.D. Luis Ángel Firpo managers
Expatriate football managers in Chile
Expatriate football managers in El Salvador
Argentine expatriate footballers
Argentine expatriate sportspeople in Colombia
Argentine expatriate sportspeople in Bolivia
Argentine expatriate sportspeople in Mexico
Argentine expatriate sportspeople in Chile
Association football midfielders